Ganesh Sharma (born 9 Sep 1996) better known by his stage name Santy Sharma is an Indian singer, rapper and lyricist from famous Namkeen city Ratlam, Madhya Pradesh.

He is known for his songs like 'Peeta Daaru', 'Suni Suni Sadko', 'Udaan', 'Ek Thi Meri Girlfriend ' and 'Killin'.

Early life and career
Santy Sharma was born in 1996 as Ganesh Sharma in Ratlam, Malwa, Madhya Pradesh, India. Santy Sharma Started his musical career in 2016 as a singer & since then he has released many songs on YouTube and musical platforms.

In 2020 Santy Sharma sang the song for Laxman Singh Rajput's film The Third Hacker.

Discography 
Suni Suni Sadko (2017)
Udaan (2018)
Koshish Meri (2019)
Peeta Daaru (2019)
Mujhe Pyaar Kar (2020)
Tribute (2020)
Ek Thi Meri Girlfriend (2021)
Killin (2021)
Choco Moco ft Nazz (2021)
Gangsta ft Nitesh. A.K.A. Nick (2021)
Black Heart (2022)
Black Heart Lofi (2022)
Ek Din (2023)
Baahon Mein (2023)

Film 
Silent Relation (as Playback singer)
The Third Hacker

References

External links 
 
 Santy Sharma on Apple Music

Indian male singers
Indian rappers
Living people
1996 births